Asunción Mita is a town, with a population of 20,936 (2018), and a municipality in the Jutiapa department of Guatemala.

Population

As of 1850, the population was approximately 3,300.

Festivals
In Asunción Mita two titular celebrations are celebrated: first from the 12th to 15 August, in honor to the Virgin of Asunción; and second from 6 to 12 December, in honor to the Virgin of Concepción. Also, they celebrate in honor to the Flower War on 7 August.

Sports
Deportivo Mictlán football club, will play the 2010/2011 season at the highest level of Guatemalan football, the Liga Mayor. They play their home games at the Estadio La Asunción.

References

Municipalities of the Jutiapa Department

pt:Jutiapa#Municípios